Malijhikanda High School is a high school in Jhenaigati Upazila, Sherpur District under the division of Mymensingh.It is a traditional school which was founded in the 1947. Late Syed Ahmed is the founding head teacher. Although the school is located in the countryside, about 1100 students study here. 

Mr.Robiul Islam is the present Head Teacher of this school.

Website of the School

References

https://productforums.google.com/forum/?fromgroups=#!topic/gec-earth-browsing/qy-v0C0QzK4
https://www.facebook.com/pages/Malijhikanda-High-School/106176272754725
http://wikimapia.org/23389597/Malijhikanda-High-School

High schools in Bangladesh
Sherpur District